400 Blows may refer to:
 The 400 Blows, a film by François Truffaut
 400 Blows (Los Angeles band)
 400 Blows (British band)